Joseph Patrick Mellor (born 28 December 1990) is an English professional rugby league footballer who plays as a  or  for the Leigh Leopards in the Betfred Super League.

He previously played for the Wigan Warriors in the Super League, and on loan from Wigan at Harlequins RL in the top flight and the Widnes Vikings in the Championship and the Super League. Mellor later joined Widnes on a permanent deal in the Super League. He also played for the Toronto Wolfpack in the Betfred Championship and the top flight.

Background
Mellor was born in Warrington, Cheshire, England.

Club career
Mellor signed as a professional for Wigan from Warrington-based amateur side Latchford. In 2009, Mellor was awarded Man-of-the-Match in the Reserve Grand Final following a fantastic performance. An injury-plagued 2010 meant limited appearances in Wigan's junior teams, however, he did play in the Under-20 Cup Final win over St Helens. He made his Super League début in rugby league whilst on loan at Harlequins in 2011's Super League XVI, coming off the bench in a 27-16 win over St. Helens in round five.

On his return to Wigan, Mellor was sent on loan to Widnes along with Dom Crosby and Logan Tomkins. Mellor featured at stand-off for the Chemics, scoring tries in the home fixtures against Barrow and Toulouse Olympique, and a brace away at Barrow.

Mellor was once again loaned to Widnes in 2012, and joined the club on a permanent contract after being released by Wigan at the end of 2012. Since permanently joining Widnes, Mellor improved over his years at the club, being regarded as one of the best players in Super League.

After the departure of captain Kevin Brown to the Warrington Wolves at the end of 2016, Mellor was handed co-captaincy alongside Chris Houston, and has been given the number 6 jersey.

On 10 November 2020, it was announced that Mellor would join Leigh for the 2021 Super League season.
On 28 May 2022, Mellor played for Leigh in their 2022 RFL 1895 Cup final victory over Featherstone.
On 3 October 2022, Mellor played for Leigh in their Million Pound Game victory over Batley which saw the club promoted back to the Super League.

References

External links
Toronto Wolfpack profile
Widnes Vikings profile
SL profile

1990 births
Living people
English rugby league players
Leigh Leopards players
London Broncos players
Rugby league five-eighths
Rugby league halfbacks
Rugby league players from Warrington
Toronto Wolfpack players
Widnes Vikings players
Wigan Warriors players